Lodsens datter (The Pilot's Daughter) is a Norwegian film from 1918 directed by Peter Lykke-Seest. It is considered lost.

The work was part of a genre of "daughter" films in fashion at the time in Scandinavian cinema, with similar titles including Alkymistens Datter (The Alchemist's Daughter), Bryggerens Datter (The Brewer's Daughter, 1912), Direktørens Datter (The Director's Daughter, 1912), Folkeførerens Datter (The Leader's Daughter, 1913), Gøglerens Datter (The Entertainer's Daughter, 1913), Guvernørens Datter (The Governor's Daughter, 1912), Herremandens Datter (The Gentleman's Daughter, 1907), Satans Datter (The Devil's Daughter, 1913), and Skipperens Datter (The Skipper's Daughter, 1907).

Plot
The film tells the story of a painter that meets the daughter of a pilot, takes her to the city, and lives with her until he meets a rich lady and marries her. The scorned girl then travels home, alone and unhappy.

Cast

 Gotfred Johansen as the painter
 Lila Lykke-Seest as the pilot's daughter, Anna
 Helene Due as the pilot's wife
 Hans Ingi Hedemark as the pilot
 Clarita Husebye as the rich lady
 Sigurd Johansen as Anna's boyfriend
 Hildur Øverland

References

External links

Lodsens datter at the National Library of Norway
Lodsens datter at Filmfront

1918 films
Norwegian silent films
Norwegian black-and-white films
Lost Norwegian films
1918 lost films
Norwegian silent short films